Jumping Downs is a   Local Nature Reserve near Aylesham, between Canterbury and Dover in Kent. It is owned by the Jumping Downs Trust  and managed by the Trust and the Kentish Stour Community Partnership.

Adders,  viviparous lizards and slow worms have been recorded on this chalk downland site. Mammals include wood mice and pygmy shrews.

There is access from South Barham Hill.

References

Local Nature Reserves in Kent